Parafovea or the parafoveal belt is a region in the retina that circumscribes the fovea and is part of the macula lutea. It is circumscribed by the perifovea.

Effect on reading
In reading, information within 1° (approximately 6–8 characters) of the point of fixation is processed in foveal vision, while information up to 6° of visual angle benefits from parafoveal preview. Studies have shown that people can tell the difference in the letters of a word in the fovea and near-parafovea (the part of the parafovea closest to the fovea), but not in the outer edges of the parafovea. In languages that read from left to right, the word immediately to the right of the fixated word is known as the parafoveal word. Information present in the parafovea can interact with information present in the fovea. The benefit the parafoveal preview has is also mediated by how common the word in the parafovea is, with less common words providing less of a reduction in fixation duration when they reach foveal fixation. As the clarity of information in the parafovea is not as great as in the fovea, the SWIFT model of eye movements in reading, while allowing for parallel processing, accounts for this difference by assigning the parafoveal less processing power the further away it is from the foveal fixation.

Effect on scene perception
Information in the parafovea can influence the processing of a scene. In categorization tasks of natural scenes information from the parafovea can be used to determine the gist of a scene well enough for a categorization judgement, though with reduced sensitivity and speed in comparison to foveal vision. An effect of parafoveal preview has also been found for emotional scenes presented in the parafovea, with people more likely shift their fixation point on emotional stimuli than neutral stimuli, when both options are presented parafoveally.

Additional images

See also
 Eye movement in reading
 Eye movement in music reading
 Fixation (visual)
 Optical coherence tomography (OCT)

References

Human eye anatomy
Visual perception